A jarana is a guitar-like string instrument from Mexico. There are different regional versions of the jarana, notably:

 Jarana huasteca, string instrument of the Huastec region, Mexico
 Jarana jarocha, string instrument of Veracruz, Mexico
 Jarana yucateca, dance and musical form of Yucatán, Mexico

It can also refer to:

Harana (serenade), a serenade tradition in rural areas in the Philippines
 A traditional Mexican couples dance, typical of Yucatán and Campeche, on the music which accompanies it 
 The noun jarana in Spanish translates to "revelry" or "animated party".

References

Mexican musical instruments
Guitar family instruments